Kyō may refer to:
 The Japanese name for Koga, a Kanto gym leader
Kyō no Go no Ni